The Slovenian Hockey League is the highest level ice hockey league in Slovenia. The championship phase is contested after the regular season to determine the national champion.

History

The Slovenian Hockey League was firstly contested in the 1991–92 season, with the championship being held at the end as the play-offs. Over time, some Slovenian teams entered the Austrian Hockey League, and joined only for the play-offs. In the 2007–08 season there was an issue, as the Croatian team Medveščak qualified for the play-offs. As the Slovenian Champion could only be a team from Slovenia, they did not take part in the play-offs. The Slohokej League was established and played its first season in 2009–10, but was cancelled after the 2011–12 season.

Teams

Winners

until 1991 – Yugoslav Hockey League
1991–92 – HK Acroni Jesenice
1992–93 – HK Acroni Jesenice
1993–94 – HK Acroni Jesenice
1994–95 – HK Olimpija Hertz
1995–96 – HK Olimpija Hertz
1996–97 – HK Olimpija Hertz
1997–98 – HK Olimpija Hertz
1998–99 – HK Olimpija

1999–2000 – HK Olimpija
2000–01 – HK Olimpija
2001–02 – HDD Olimpija
2002–03 – HDD ZM Olimpija
2003–04 – HDD ZM Olimpija
2004–05 – HK Acroni Jesenice
2005–06 – HK Acroni Jesenice
2006–07 – HDD ZM Olimpija
2007–08 – HK Acroni Jesenice

2008–09 – HK Acroni Jesenice
2009–10 – HK Acroni Jesenice
2010–11 – HK Acroni Jesenice
2011–12 – HDD Tilia Olimpija
2012–13 – HDD Telemach Olimpija
2013–14 – HDD Telemach Olimpija
2014–15 – HDD Jesenice
2015–16 – HDD Telemach Olimpija
2016–17 – HDD SIJ Acroni Jesenice

2017–18 – HDD SIJ Acroni Jesenice
2018–19 – HK SŽ Olimpija
2019–20 – No winners (COVID-19 pandemic)
2020–21 – HDD SIJ Acroni Jesenice
2021–22 – HK SŽ Olimpija
2022–23 – HK SŽ Olimpija

Notes

See also
Slohokej League
Slovenian Ice Hockey Cup
Yugoslav Ice Hockey League

References

External links
Hokejska zveza Slovenije 

 
Top tier ice hockey leagues in Europe
1
Sports leagues in Slovenia